James Hill Galt (11 August 1885 – 17 November 1935) was a Scottish professional footballer who played as a left half for Rangers and Everton.

Club career
Galt played with Rangers for eight years between 1906 and 1914. He made 240 appearances and scored six goals for the club. During his time at Ibrox he won three Scottish league championships, two Glasgow Cups and three Glasgow Merchants Charity Cups, as well as the Edinburgh Exhibition Cup in 1908.

Galt swapped Glasgow for Merseyside in 1914 and joined Everton. He made 36 appearances for the Toffees and scored four goals. Despite captaining them to the First Division title, he left after only one season when World War I took hold and official football was suspended in England, returning to Scotland to play for Partick Thistle and Third Lanark. He guested for Fulham during the war.

International career
Galt won his two Scotland caps in May 1908. He scored on his second appearance, against Ireland on 14 May. Galt also played and scored in one unofficial wartime international, against England on 13 May 1916.

Military service
During the First World War he served with Army Service Corps and latterly the Argyll and Sutherland Highlanders as a Second Lieutenant. He was wounded in action, suffering severe shell-shock, which meant that he did not resume his football career to any great extent after the war ended.

Personal life (military service)
Galt was also an accomplished golfer: he battled for the 'Scottish Professional Footballers Golf Championship' with Jimmy Lawson of Dundee who later switched sports to turn professional in the United States.

After retiring from football, Galt ran a series of billiard halls with ex-Rangers teammate Jimmy Gordon.

References

Sources

External links

1885 births
1935 deaths
Rangers F.C. players
Everton F.C. players
Scottish footballers
Association football wing halves
Scotland international footballers
Argyll and Sutherland Highlanders officers
British Army personnel of World War I
Scottish Football League players
Scottish Junior Football Association players
English Football League players
Scottish Football League representative players
Third Lanark A.C. players
Scotland wartime international footballers
People from Saltcoats
Footballers from North Ayrshire
Royal Army Service Corps officers
Ardrossan Winton Rovers F.C. players
Ardeer Thistle F.C. players
Partick Thistle F.C. players
Alloa Athletic F.C. players
Fulham F.C. wartime guest players
People with post-traumatic stress disorder